The men's 3000 metres steeplechase event at the 1996 World Junior Championships in Athletics was held in Sydney, Australia, at International Athletic Centre on 22 and 24 August.

Medalists

Results

Final
24 August

Heats
22 August

Heat 1

Heat 2

Heat 3

Participation
According to an unofficial count, 33 athletes from 21 countries participated in the event.

References

3000 metres steeplechasechase
Steeplechase at the World Athletics U20 Championships